Azadipyrromethenes (ADPM) is a class of dyes used experimentally as photosensitizers for photodynamic therapy.

Some derivatives can usefully absorb in the near-infrared.

See also
 Pyrromethene

References

Dyes
Phenol ethers
Organobromides